Jason, Mark and Richard Quinn were three brothers killed by the Ulster Volunteer Force (UVF) in a firebomb attack on their home in Ballymoney, County Antrim, Northern Ireland on 12 July 1998. The crime was committed towards the end of the three-decade period known as "The Troubles".

One man, Garfield Gilmour, was found guilty of murdering the three brothers 15 months later and sentenced to life imprisonment after admitting that he had driven three other men to the house to commit the fatal petrol-bombing. Although Gilmour named the three alleged killers, they were never charged due to a lack of concrete evidence.

Background

The Quinn family, consisting of mother Chrissie and sons Jason, Mark and Richard lived in the Carnany estate in the predominantly Protestant town of Ballymoney. The family was of a mixed religious background. Mother Chrissie was Roman Catholic from a mixed background and the boys' father Jim Dillon was Catholic. After separating from her husband, Chrissie reared the boys as Protestant "to avoid the hassle". Chrissie lived with her Protestant partner Raymond Craig in Carnany which had only a few Catholic residents and was mostly Protestant, reflecting the religious make-up of Ballymoney itself. The boys, aged 9, 10 and 11, attended a local state school and on the evening before their deaths had been helping to build the estate's Eleventh Night loyalist bonfire. A fourth brother, Lee, was staying with his grandmother in Rasharkin at the time of the attack.

The killings took place at the height of the stand-off over the Orange Order march at Drumcree, which created a tense atmosphere in various towns across Northern Ireland. In Ballymoney, the previous year, an off-duty Royal Ulster Constabulary (RUC) officer, Gregory Taylor, was beaten to death by a group of loyalist bandsmen. The killing followed a row about the RUC's position after loyal order marches had been banned from the nearby nationalist village of Dunloy. In the weeks before the fatal attack, the children's mother Chrissie had expressed fear that she wasn't welcome in the area and that there was a possibility the family home might be attacked by loyalists. The Ballymoney Times reported a story the week of the deaths, stating that a resident of the Carnany estate called in and was concerned about tension in the area adding something serious might happen "unless Catholic residents were left alone". Various members of Chrissie's family had lived in Carnany but due to several incidents only Chrissie and her sons remained. The family had only been living in the home, which was previously occupied by the boys' aunt, for six days before the attack.

The attack
The attack occurred at around half past four in the morning as the inhabitants of the house slept. A car containing members of the Ulster Volunteer Force (UVF), a loyalist paramilitary organisation, arrived at the house and threw a petrol bomb through a window at the rear of the house. The petrol bomb was made from a whiskey bottle. The sounds of the boys' shouting had woken their mother, who found her bedroom full of smoke. Chrissie Quinn, Raymond Craig and a family friend Christina Archibald escaped the resulting fire with minor injuries. Chrissie had thought the boys had escaped the fire as she could not locate them in the dense smoke before she jumped to safety from a first floor window. Two of the brothers’ bodies were found in their mother's bedroom and the other in another bedroom.
Chrissie was taken to hospital and released the next day after receiving minor injuries and shock in the attack.

Reaction

The M.P. for the area, Ian Paisley, visited the site of the attack and described the killings as "diabolical", "repugnant" and it "stained Protestantism". However, in an interview with ITN he stated that "The IRA have carried out worse murders than we had in Ballymoney over and over again".

Then British Prime Minister Tony Blair denounced the attack as "an act of barbarism".

United States President Bill Clinton extended the condolences of the American people to the Quinn family, New York City mayor Rudy Giuliani extended sympathy to the family from the city of New York. and Massachusetts Senator Ted Kennedy condemned the killings, stating "the Orange Order must recognize that its refusal to abide by the decision of the Parades Commission led to the murder of the Quinn boys".

Representatives of other groups from all sides of the constitutional issue in Northern Ireland also condemned the killings. The then Chelsea F.C. chairman, Ken Bates, offered a £100,000 reward for information leading to a conviction for the attackers. Irish Taoiseach Bertie Ahern attended a memorial mass in Dublin for the children.

At the brothers' Requiem Mass, the bishop of the Roman Catholic Diocese of Down and Connor, Dr. Walsh observed that

The Progressive Unionist Party, which has political links to the UVF, made no comment that the UVF was implicated in the attack.

Conviction of Garfield Gilmour
Garfield Gilmour, a local loyalist, was arrested soon after the killings and charged with three counts of murder. He was found guilty of murder for his part in the attack and sentenced to life imprisonment in October 1999. He admitted to driving the car which had contained three members of the UVF unit to the Quinn home. He named the three men as Johnny McKay and brothers Raymond and Ivan Parke. However, the three men were not charged with the murders due to a lack of concrete evidence.
Gilmour was described at his trial as a hard working, farm machinery salesman who came from a middle-class background who was unwillingly part of the attack which killed the Quinn brothers.
The judge described Gilmour as an "accomplished liar".
Gilmour and his girlfriend Christina Lofthouse alleged that an uncle of the Quinn boys, Colm Quinn, had approached their daughter offering her a sweet, knowing it was a small piece of cannabis. Colm Quinn confirmed that the couple had made allegations against him previously that he was a drug dealer. He then had to flee the Carnany estate. However, returning to his old house three months before the fatal attack on his nephews, Quinn claimed he was confronted by Gilmour again and was warned he was "going to be sorted out".

The Orange Order released a press statement a year after the attack, stating, "According to today's judgment the murders were a combination of a sectarian attack by the UVF and a personal grudge between Gilmour and the uncle of the three boys," and voiced the "Order's absolute commitment to ensuring that justice is done for their family".

Gilmour's conviction for murder was reduced to manslaughter on appeal on 5 June 2000 and he was released six years later. Nine days later, his life sentence was replaced by a fixed prison sentence of 14 years.

Aftermath
After being released from hospital Chrissie Quinn returned to her mother's native Rasharkin to live. The boys were buried two days later in St Mary's cemetery in Rasharkin after requiem Mass. Thousands of both Catholics and Protestants attended the funeral.

A number of loyalist bands defied RUC requests not to play music while marching past the boys' grandmother's house in the days after the killings.

In April 1999 the former home of the boys in Carnany Park was demolished and replaced with a children's play park as a memorial.

An uncle of the boys, Frankie Quinn, appeared in court in 2007 accused of stabbing Garfield Gilmour in Ballymoney. Quinn was successful in an application for bail.

References

Sources
 Lost Lives:The stories of the men, women and children who died as a result of the Northern Ireland troubles, David McKittrick, Seamus Kelters, Brian Feeney and Christ Thornton, pp. 1434–1436. ISBN 9 781840 182279.

1990s in County Antrim
1990s murders in Northern Ireland
1998 crimes in Ireland
1998 in Northern Ireland
Ballymoney
Deaths by improvised explosive device in Northern Ireland
Explosions in 1998
July 1998 events in the United Kingdom
July 1998 crimes
Murdered Irish children
Terrorist incidents in County Antrim
Terrorist incidents in the United Kingdom in 1998
The Troubles in County Antrim
Ulster Volunteer Force actions
Murder in County Antrim